Coltrane is an album by jazz musician John Coltrane which was released in October 1957 by Prestige Records. The recordings took place at the studio of Rudy Van Gelder in Hackensack, New Jersey, and document Coltrane's first session as a leader. It has been reissued at times under the title of The First Trane!.

Background
As a result of his exposure as a member of the Miles Davis Quintet, Prestige Records owner and producer Bob Weinstock offered Coltrane a recording contract. Dated April 9, 1957, it stipulated three albums per year at $300 per album. Coltrane had previously recorded as a sideman, and had co-led a session with Paul Quinichette (released in 1959 as Cattin' with Coltrane and Quinichette), but never as sole bandleader.

Coltrane had been fired by Davis in April 1957 for drug abuse, and had returned to Philadelphia to end his habit. He returned to New York City for mid-May sessions with Prestige, this one taking place the day after Memorial Day. By the summer, Coltrane would be recording with Thelonious Monk and playing as a member of Monk's quartet for the rest of the year.

For his debut, Coltrane chose a tune by his friend Calvin Massey, in addition to three standards including the relatively obscure "Time Was". Sidemen included Paul Chambers and Red Garland from the Davis band, and Philadelphia colleagues Johnnie Splawn and Albert Heath.

Track listing

Personnel
 John Coltrane – tenor saxophone
 Johnnie Splawn – trumpet on "Bakai", "Straight Street", "While My Lady Sleeps", "Chronic Blues"
 Sahib Shihab – baritone saxophone on "Bakai", "Straight Street", "Chronic Blues"
 Red Garland – piano on side one
 Mal Waldron – piano on side two
 Paul Chambers – bass
 Albert "Tootie" Heath – drums

References

1957 albums
John Coltrane albums
Prestige Records albums
Albums produced by Bob Weinstock
Hard bop albums